"SYL" is a song by Indian singer Sidhu Moosewala. The song was released just under three weeks after his death on 23 June 2022. The song was produced by Mxrci, and written by Moose Wala.

Lyrical content
In the song, Sidhu speaks about issues related to the Satluj Yamuna link canal, a contentious issue of sharing of river waters between Haryana and Punjab. The song also calls for the release of Sikh prisoners who are languishing in jails. In verse three, Sidhu talks about the 2021 Indian farmers' Republic Day protest.

Music video
The video opens with an interview of Aam Aadmi Party member Sushil Gupta.

Censorship
After three days of release, the song was removed from YouTube and banned by the Indian government on 26 June.

Commercial performance
Within one hour of release, song gained more than one million views on YouTube.

"SYL" debuted at number 81 on the Canadian Hot 100 chart.

Credits and personnel
Sidhu Moose Wala – songwriting
Mxrci – production
PixlPxl – mixing and engineering
Navkaran Brar – artwork

Charts

References

2022 songs
2022 singles
Sidhu Moose Wala songs